Take 2 is a 2017 Singaporean comedy film directed by Ivan Ho and executive produced by Jack Neo. This marks Ho's directorial debut after being a longtime scriptwriting partner of Neo's, and one of two films distributed by mm2 Entertainment during the Chinese New Year period in 2017, the other being The Fortune Handbook.

Plot
On a venture to turn over a new leaf and break away from their past misdemeanours, Ah Hu and his 3 other cell mates set up a new F&B venture selling Japanese ramen. But being ex-convicts hinder their success and their inability to fit in with society lands them in numerous comical situations. Their clumsiness ultimately causes the business to flounder. Unwilling to give up the good fight and believing that change will bring about a solution, the four friends come up with a new idea; a 3-in-1 tuition center for students that also provides F&B and massage services for their parents. Good times don’t last when Ah Hu’s nemesis, Di Tie kidnaps his estranged son. Having sworn never to fall back to the path of wrongdoing, it is down to Ah Hu and his friends to save his son without weapons, alerting the cops, and breaking the law. So begins a daring yet entertaining rescue mission.

Cast
 Wang Lei as Mad Dog
 Ryan Lian as Ah Hu
 Maxi Lim as Jian Ren
 Gadrick Chin as Sha Bao
 Chen Tianwen as Di Tie, Ah Hu's old nemesis
 Dennis Chew as Ah Hong
 Henry Thia as Hei Ge, Ah Hu's ex-gang leader
 Charmaine Sei as Ah Yu, Ah Hu's older sister
 Kanny Theng as Joey, Jian Ren's love interest
 Shawn Ho as Ah Guang, Ah Hu's son

Production

Pre-production
Neo, whose films has been associated with Chinese New Year, said in an interview with The Straits Times that "it's time to give other new film-makers a chance to make their own films". As such, he made Ho, who co-wrote the script for Ah Boys to Men 3: Frogmen, Long Long Time Ago, Long Long Time Ago 2 and the "That Girl" segment of 7 Letters, the director of Take 2, while he serves as executive producer and provides Ho with directorial advice.

Casting and crew
Wang Lei, who plays Mad Dog in the film, signed up "without hesitation" because the role mirrors his life experience as a former gambler.

Ryan Lian, who had taken on minor roles for 17 years, and starred as a gangster in Long Long Time Ago and Long Long Time Ago 2, would be making his debut as one of the leads. In order to fully immerse himself in his role of a former convict, Lian would interact with ex-convicts to understand their lives better. According to an interview with the New Paper, he would "eat and talk with them for about three hours (almost every day)", "(watch) the way they behaved, and they would share their life stories".

Dennis Chew, who had previously cross-dressed as Aunty Lucy in Paris and Milan, would take on the role of the lady boss of a tuition centre, among five other roles. For this role, he had to put on a female bodysuit, which had to be custom made and ordered from overseas. It takes 1 hour and 10 minutes for Chew to finish the costume and makeup.

Shawn Ho, then a final-year student studying for a Higher Nitec in film-making at ITE College Central, was approached by the casting directors on the first day of his internship to play Ryan Lian's son in the film, after they have auditioned many people. In order to prepare for his role, he had to brush up on his Mandarin skills using a personal tutor.

Filming
Filming started on June 23, 2016, and ended in end July.

Reception

Critical reception
Rachel Chan of The New Paper rated the film a 3.5 out of 5 stars, feeling that "it is nice to see a heavy topic on ex-convicts being made into a light-hearted film while still keeping the comedic factor and emotions running high".

Boon Chan of The Straits Times rated the film a 2.5 out of 5 stars, feeling that Ho "cannot quite decide if he wants to do a drama or a comedy", and Lian, being the film's lead, "surrounded here by discordant notes, from Dennis Chew in a number of cross-dressing roles to Chen Tianwen as a crazily flamboyant nemesis to a bizarre soundtrack of European songs", drawing the attention away from him.

References

External links
 

2017 films
2017 comedy films
Singaporean crime comedy films
2010s Mandarin-language films
2010s crime comedy films